Girindra Kumar Baruah is an Indian politician in Assam. He represented Barhampur in the Assam Assembly during 1985–90. In 1996, he won Nowgong Sadar Assembly Constituency and represented it till 2011, when he lost to Indian National Congress candidate Durlabh Chamua.

References

Asom Gana Parishad politicians
Assam MLAs 2006–2011
Living people
Year of birth missing (living people)
Indian National Congress politicians from Assam